Oulainen (also ) is a town and a municipality of Finland. The municipality has a population of 
which 
is water. The population density is
. Oulainen is founded in 1865, and it received township rights in 1977.

The municipality is unilingually Finnish. The municipality has previously also been known as "" in Swedish documents, but is today referred to as "Oulainen" also in Swedish.

Geography 
Neighbouring municipalities are Alavieska, Haapavesi, Merijärvi, Pyhäjoki, Raahe and Ylivieska. In addition to the town center, the municipality includes the villages of Kilpua, Lehtopää, Matkaniva, Petäjäskoski, Piipsjärvi and Honkaranta.

History 
Oulainen was first mentioned in 1572 as Oulahais and as a part of the Pyhäjoki parish. A farm named Oulahainen was established earlier. The name comes from a dialectal word oulu meaning "flooding waters" (see also Oulu) and seems to suggest a Tavastian origin. Alpo Räisänen suggests that the name could be of Savonian or Karelian origin. 

Oulainen became a chapel community in 1682, a parish in 1870, a kauppala in 1967 and a town in 1977.

Events 
Notable annual events include the National Veteran Machines Fair and Oulainen Music Weeks. Oulainen Music Weeks were organized for the twentieth time in 2006. The Oulainen Youth Choir has received international acclaim.

Notable people
Eeli Erkkilä, Minister and Member of Parliament, Moped champion
Elsi Hetemäki-Olander, Member of Parliament
Katja Hänninen, Member of Parliament
Merja Kiviranta, triathlonist
Rosa-Maria Ryyti, model and Miss Finland 2015 beauty pageant titleholder

See also
 Oulainen railway station

References

External links

 Town of Oulainen – Official website 
 Oulainen Music Weeks

 
Cities and towns in Finland
Populated places established in 1865